Salvelinus maxillaris is a cold-water fish in the family Salmonidae which is endemic to Scotland. Locales in which it inhabits include The Minch, Loch Merkland, Loch Clair, Loch Coulin, Loch Maree, Loch Langavat, and the Isle of Lewis.

References

Endemic fauna of Scotland